Ayi Silva Kangani (born 15 May 2003) is an Israeli footballer who currently plays as a forward for Bnei Yehuda.

Early life
Kangani was born in Israel to Richard and Chantal, migrants from Togo. He is one of five children. In 2017, his family received temporary residency status which allowed his father to register him with a football club. His father chose Bnei Yehuda over Maccabi Tel Aviv fearing that his son would not get a chance to play over more well connected families at Maccabi. Kangani attended Zalman Shazar High School in Tel Aviv.

Club career
From the ages of 10 to 14, Kangani bounced around between youth clubs in Israel. Due to the lack of an Israeli identity card, Kangani could not be registered as a player with the IFA.

Kangani made his first team debut on 6 June 2020, coming on as a substitute for Matan Baltaxa in the 60th minute against Hapoel Hadera. Eleven minutes later, he scored his first league goal giving his club a four-goal lead on their way to a 5–0 victory. On 8 June 2020, Kangani signed a three-year professional contract with Bnei Yehuda.

On 30 March 2021 he was loaned to the Liga Alef side Hakoah Amidar Ramat Gan.

Personal life
Kangani is scheduled to be drafted into service with the IDF. His younger brother, Richie, is also a footballer in the youth teams at Bnei Yehuda.

Career statistics

Club

Notes

References

2003 births
Living people
Israeli footballers
Togolese footballers
Bnei Yehuda Tel Aviv F.C. players
Hakoah Maccabi Amidar Ramat Gan F.C. players
Israeli Premier League players
Liga Leumit players
Association football forwards
Israeli people of Togolese descent